Weed Country is an American reality television series that aired on the Discovery Channel. The series premiered on February 20, 2013, during Discovery Channel's programming block titled "Weed Wednesdays". The series followed dealers, growers and patients of the marijuana trade located within the Emerald Triangle, along with the enforcers of the law at the Siskiyou County Sheriff's office.

Cast

 Mike Boutin, farmer
 Tawni Boutin, farmer and wife of Mike Boutin
 Matt Shotwell, a.k.a. Matt Greenwell, owner of Greenwell's Dispensary
 Skweeze, Vallejo native and driver of the hooptie car for Matt Greenwell
 Nathaniel Morris, cannabis activist and scientist
 B.E. Smith, Aaron Smith, cannabis activist
 Lieutenant Matt Thomson
 Sheriff Jon E. Lopy
 Sergeant Mike Gilley

Episodes

Criticism
Much like the Discovery Channel series Moonshiners, Weed Country was criticized as a scripted television show promoted as an unscripted show.

Matt Shotwell, the owner of Greenwell's Dispensary, faced criminal charges in connection with the raid and closure of the dispensary in Vallejo, California; charges against him were dismissed in 2013.

References

External links
 
 

2013 American television series debuts
2013 American television series endings
English-language television shows
Discovery Channel original programming
American television series about cannabis
Cannabis in California